Luis Torralva (13 March 1902 – 20 May 1985) was a Chilean tennis player. He competed in the men's singles and doubles events at the 1924 Summer Olympics.

References

External links
 

1902 births
1985 deaths
Chilean male tennis players
Olympic tennis players of Chile
Tennis players at the 1924 Summer Olympics
Place of birth missing